The N series is Honda's first automotive diesel engine, an inline-four for medium-sized vehicles. It uses common rail direct injection, which Honda brands as i-CTDi (Intelligent Common-rail Turbocharged Direct injection). The most notable feature is the aluminium block, which uses proprietary technology in the manufacturing process to provide light weight and high rigidity. Roller chains drive two overhead camshafts. A variable-geometry turbocharger and intercooler are used.

N15A1
The i-DTEC engine uses a 2-Stage turbocharger from Wastegate Type & Variable Geometry Turbocharger (VGT) left/right. It enables strong power from about 1,500 rpm. With Diesel particulate filter (DPF), Start-stop system, Exhaust gas recirculation system (EGR) & Small Size Intercooler.

Specifications
 Bore & Stroke: 
 Cylinder Layout: inline 4
 Displacement: 
 Valve Configuration: 16-valve DOHC
 Type: i-DTEC
 Compression ratio: 16.0:1
 Max boost: 
 Max power:  at 3600 rpm
 Max torque:  at 1750 rpm
 Redline: 4500 rpm

Applications 

 Honda City (2003–2023)
 Honda Amaze (2013–2023)
 Honda Mobilio (2015–2018)
 Honda Jazz (2015-2023)
 Honda BR-V (2015–2020)
 Honda WR-V (2016–2023)

N16A1/N16A2/N16A3
The i-DTEC engine uses a single turbocharger from Wastegate Type & Variable Geometry Turbocharger (VGT). It enables strong power from about 1,500 rpm. With Diesel particulate filter (DPF), IDLE STOP SYSTEM, Exhaust gas recirculation SYSTEM (EGR) & Small Size Intercooler.

Specifications
 Bore & Stroke: 
 Cylinder Layout: inline 4
 Displacement: 
 Valve Configuration: 16-valve DOHC
 Type: i-DTEC
 Compression ratio: 16.0:1
 Max boost: 
 Max power:  at 4000 rpm
 Max torque:  at 2000 rpm
 Redline: 4500 rpm

Applications 
N16A1
 Honda Civic (FK3)
N16A2
 Honda CR-V (RE6, Europe)
 Honda CR-V (RW7/RW8, India/Philippines)
N16A3
 Honda HR-V (RU8)

N16A4
This is an uprated version of the N16 noted above having 2 turbochargers. Details are similar, except for:
 Max power:  at 4000 rpm
 Max torque:  at 2000 rpm

Applications 
 Honda CR-V (RE6, Europe)
 Honda CR-V (RW7/RW8, Thailand)

N22A
The i-CTDi engine uses a variable-nozzle turbocharger from Honeywell. It enables strong power from about 1,500 rpm.
This Honda engine is apparently exclusive for European markets where Honda could operate.

Specifications
 Bore & Stroke: 
 Cylinder Layout: inline 4
 Displacement: 
 Valve Configuration: 16-valve DOHC
 Type: i-CTDi
 Compression ratio: 16.7:1
 Max boost: 
 Max power:  at 4000 rpm
 Max torque:  at 2000 rpm
 Redline: 5000 rpm

 Accord (CN1) (2002–08)
 Accord Tourer (CN2) (2002–08)
 FR-V: (BE5)
 CR-V (RD9/RE6) (2004-09)
 Civic (FK3 / FN3) (2005-11)

N22B
Whilst the N22A has the intake ports on the front of the engine, the N22B has the new standard front intake/rear exhaust port configuration. The stroke has been slightly reduced to qualify for sub-2200 cc engine displacement, for tax and registration purposes in some jurisdictions.
The N22A has exhaust on the rear of the engine.

Specifications
 Bore & Stroke: 
 Cylinder Layout: inline 4
 Displacement: 
 Valve Configuration: 16-valve DOHC
 Type: i-DTEC
 Compression ratio: 16.3:1
 Max power:  at 4000 rpm
 Max torque:  at 2000 rpm

Meets Euro 5 emissions standards.

N22B2
High output; specifications based on Accord

Specifications
 Bore & Stroke: 
 Cylinder Layout: inline 4
 Displacement: 
 Valve Configuration: 16-valve DOHC
 Type: i-DTEC
 Compression ratio: 16.3:1
 Transmission: 6MT
 0-100: 8.7 sec (7,9 Type S)
 Top speed: 

Combined cycle fuel consumption is a frugal , with an associated  emissions figure of /km.

See also
Circle L engine
 List of Honda engines

References

External links
 Honda Motor Co. (Official)
 direction of the development of environmental technology and environmental technology diesel (Honda) Information Ministry of Economy

N engine
Diesel engines by model
Straight-four engines